Cultivation theory is a sociological and communications framework to examine the lasting effects of media, primarily television. It suggests individuals routinely exposed to certain media for extended durations at a time  perceive the world's social reality as it is similarly  presented through the media they are exposed to, which then influences their attitudes and behaviours.

Cultivation theory was first created by professor George Gerbner in the 1960s;  it was later expanded upon by Gerbner and Larry Gross in 1976. Gerbner formulated his paradigm for mass communication in 1973 that included three types of analysis: The first type of analysis is institutional process analysis, which looks at what institutions are supporting and distributing the content in question. The second type of analysis is message system analysis. Message system analysis aims to identify the content of message patterns in television and media. The third type of analysis is the cultivation analysis that is defined as the longitudinal surveys of people’s opinions on certain subjects with the key variable being levels of media reception such as television viewing. This analysis is known as the Cultivation Theory.

Cultivation theory began as a way to test the impact of television on viewers, especially how exposure to violence through television affects human beings. The theory's key proposition is that "the more time people spend 'living' in the television world, the more likely they are to believe social reality aligns with reality portrayed on television." Gerbner believed that audience members used television to "fill the gaps" of their knowledge about certain experiences that they had not had for themselves. Because cultivation theory assumes the existence of objective reality and value-neutral research, it can be categorized as part of positivistic philosophy.

The more media that people consume, the more their perceptions change. Such images and messages, especially when repeated, help bring about the culture that they portray. Cultivation Theory aims to understand how long-term exposure to television programming, with its recurrent patterns of messages and images, can contribute to individuals' shared assumptions about the world around them.

In a 2004 study, surveying almost 2,000 articles published in the top three mass communication journals since 1956, Jennings Bryant and Dorina Miron found that cultivation theory was the third most frequently utilized cultural theory.

Description
Cultivation theory suggests that exposure to media affects a viewer's perceptions of reality, drawing attention to three aspects: institutions, messages, and publics.

Television, Gerbner suggested, binds diverse communities together by socializing people into standardized roles and behaviours; thus, television functions as part of the enculturation process. Gerbner's research focused on the larger meaning of heavy television consumption instead of the meaning behind specific messages.

Mainstreaming is the process by which TV viewers from disparate groups develop a common outlook of the world through exposure to the same images and labels, the effect being stronger among those whose TV viewing is more constant.
 Blurring refers to the fusion of traditional distinctions,
 Blending refers to the emergence of new conceptions into television's cultural mainstream, and
 Bending refers to shifting the mainstream to the institutional interests of the medium and its sponsors.

Resonance occurs when things viewed on television are congruent with the actual lived realities of viewers.

Perceptions of Violence 
Gerbner's initial work looked specifically at the effects of television violence on American audiences. Measuring the effect of violence underscored the larger part of Gerbner's work on cultivation theory. Therefore, he measured dramatic violence, defined as "the overt expression or threat of physical force as part of the plot." Gerbner's research also focused on the interpretation by high-use viewers of the prevalence of crime on television versus reality. He argues that, since a high percentage of programs include violent or crime-related content, viewers who spend a lot of time watching are inevitably exposed to high levels of crime and violence.

In 1968, Gerbner conducted a survey to demonstrate this theory. Following his previous results, he placed television viewers into three categories: light viewers (less than 2 hours a day), medium viewers (2–4 hours a day), and heavy viewers (more than 4 hours a day). He found that heavy viewers held beliefs and opinions similar to those portrayed on television, which demonstrated the compound effect of media influence. Heavy viewers experienced shyness, loneliness, and depression much more than those who watched less often. From this study, Gerbner then began to work on what would become the Mean World Syndrome, which is based on the fact that heavy viewers of television, particularly violence-related content, are more likely than light viewers to believe that the world is more frightening and dangerous than it actually is.

In 2012, people with heavy viewing habits were found to believe that 5% of society was involved in law enforcement. In contrast, people with light viewing habits estimated a more realistic 1%.

TV viewing and fear of crime 
In most of the surveys conducted by Gerbner, the results revealed a small but statistically significant relationship between television consumption and fear of becoming the victim of a crime. Those with light viewing habits predicted their weekly odds of being a victim were 1 in 100; those with heavy viewing habits predicted 1 in 10. Actual crime statistics showed the risk to be 1 in 10,000.

Supporting this finding is a survey done with college students that showed a significant correlation between the attention paid to local crime and one's fearfulness. There was also a significant correlation between fear of crime and violence and the number of times the respondents viewed television per week.

Local news has been frequently analyzed for cultivation, as they rely "heavily on sensational coverage of crime and other mayhem with particular emphasis on homicide and violence", while news agencies boast of their allegiance to report factually. Gerbner found that heavy viewers of news were more likely to overestimate crime rates and risk of personal exposure to crime and underestimate the safety of their neighborhoods. Additionally, several other studies point out the correlation between viewing local news and fear of crime, with Gross and Aiday (2003) finding the relationship between local news exposure and fear of crimes to be independent of local crime rates.

Aside from local news, national news, police shows, and general TV news viewing are also related to a fear of crime. Additionally, non-genre-specific TV viewing has been associated with fear of crime.

Busselle (2003) found that parents who watch more programs portraying crime and violence are more likely to warn their children about crime during their high school years; these warnings, in turn, increased the students' own crime estimates, suggesting cultivation takes place through both direct and indirect processes.

Criticism 
Jennings Bryant points out that cultivation research focuses more on the effects rather than who or what is being influenced, being more to do with the whys and hows, as opposed to gathering normative data as to the whats, whos, and wheres. Daniel Chandler argues that while television does have some effect on how we perceive the world around us, Gerbner's study does not consider the lived experiences of those who do inhabit high crime areas. Horace Newcomb argues that violence is not presented as uniformly on television as the theory assumes; therefore, television cannot be responsible for cultivating the same sense of reality for all viewers. Another problem with this theory is that it is going to be more challenging for people to think about ways in which they can create an environment that is fairer and less damaging for new generations to come since it is easier to spread fake information because of all the media that today’s society has. As technology and media evolves, today’s society is not going to be able to keep up. By the time they find ways to create a just and less damaging environment for newer generations, technology will have evolved, and society will have to find more ways right away. It’ll be a never-ending cycle.

Background
In 1968, the National Commission on the Causes and Prevention of Violence was formed to address issues regarding violence in American culture, including racial injustice culminating in the assassination of Martin Luther King Jr, as well as the assassinations of Robert and John F. Kennedy. One area of interest for the administration of Lyndon Johnson was the effect of television violence on audiences.

George Gerbner began work on a federally-funded project at the Annenberg School of Communications. In 1972, Congress facilitated the creation of the Surgeon General's Scientific Advisory Committee on Television and Social Behavior, which funded many studies, including the CIP. His research found less violence in reality than in prime time television.

Cultivation theory is based on three core assumptions:

Medium: the first assumption is that television is fundamentally different from other forms of mass media.
Audience: cultivation theory does not predict what people will do after watching a violent program but rather posits a connection between people's fears of a violence-filled world and their exposure to violent programming. The exposure to violent programming leads to what Gerbner calls the Mean World Syndrome, the idea that long-term exposure to violent media will lead to a distorted view that the world is more violent than it is.
Function and Effect: television's effects are limited because it is a part of a larger sociocultural system. Therefore, although the effects of watching television may increase or decrease at any point in time, its effect is consistently present.
There are three orders of effect that come with the Cultivation Theory. The First Order Effects describe how people's behaviour changes when exposed to mass media. The Second Order Effect encompasses the viewers' values and attitudes depending on what they are watching. The Third Order Effect is the change in the viewer's observation behaviour.

Research
Using message system analysis as a tool helps researchers study viewer perceptions of reality, their perceptions of the observable world, and can evaluate transmitted media content.

Many theorists have extended Gerbner's theory. Gerbner's research focused on TV violence, but current research examines a variety of factors. Childhood viewing may be associated with overall self-esteem in children, and affect one's beliefs as an adult.

Studies outside the U.S., where the programming is less homogeneous and repetitive, produced results that are less consistent. Australian students who watched US television programs (especially adventure and crime shows) were more likely to view Australia as dangerous; however, they didn't perceive America as dangerous, even though they were watching US programs.

The cultivation effect is not specific to genre or program, but can result from cumulative exposure to stable patterns of content on television. Jonathan Cohen and Gabriel Weimann found cultivation more prevalent among teenagers and young adults, who may then exhibit cultivation longevity.

Viewers tended toward greater psychosocial health when watching no more than 2 hours of television each day, following recommendations by the American Academy of Pediatrics (AAP), with an even greater impact on women. One study examined possible effects of viewing alcohol consumption in music videos."

Another study looked at interactive video games and found the viewer's role within the game is essential in the progression of the story. Participants interacted with other players in real-time, with a strong showing of the cultivation of participants.

Gerbner et al. developed an index for mean world syndrome. Those with heavy viewing habits become suspicious of other people's motives, expecting the worst. For example, heavy viewers of violent television are much more likely to be afraid of walking alone at night in fear that they will get robbed, mugged, or even killed. This results in the heavy viewers to try and protect themselves more than others by, for example, having watchdogs, buying new locks, investing in a security camera system, and owning guns.

Heavy viewers
Heavy viewers are individuals who watch at least four hours of television a day. However, Nielsen defined it as watching more than 11 hours a day. Heavy viewers are consistently characterized as being more susceptible to images and messages. They also rely more on television to cultivate their perceptions of the real world. In a 2014 study done on the cultivation effects of reality television, an Indiana University study found that young girls who regularly watched the MTV show Teen Mom had an unrealistic view of teen pregnancy.

Several cognitive mechanisms that explain cultivation effects have been put forth by Shrum (1995, 1996, 1997). Shrum's availability-heuristic explanation suggests that heavy viewers tend to retain more vivid memories of instances of television reality and more readily access those memories when surveyors ask them questions, resulting in more responses related to viewing, more quickly given. Another mechanism that might explain the cultivation phenomenon is a cognitive-narrative mechanism. Previous research suggests that the realism of narratives in combination with individual-level "transportability", or the ability to be less critical of a narrative, might facilitate cultivation effects.

Dramatic violence
Dramatic violence is the "overt expression or serious threat of physical force as part of the plot."

Shows such as Law & Order SVU and CSI: Miami use murder to frame each episode of their shows, underscoring the presence of gratuitous and dramatic violence. The idea of dramatic violence reinforces the relationship between fear and entertainment. Though death is being used as a plot point, it also functions to cultivate an image of looming violence.

Magic bullet theory
The magic bullet theory is a linear model of communication concerned with audiences directly influenced by mass media and the media's power over them.

It assumes that the media's message is a bullet fired from a media "gun" into the viewer's head. Similarly, the hypodermic needle model uses the same idea of direct injection. It suggests that the media delivers its messages straight into a passive audience's body.

Television reality
Cultivation theory research seems to indicate that heavy viewing can result in this reality, a set of beliefs based on content rather than facts. Generally, the beliefs of heavy viewers about the world are consistent with the repetitive and emphasized images and themes presented on television. As such, heavy viewing cultivates a television-shaped world view.

This false reality or "symbolic world" Gerbner discusses can be seen through the media's portrayal of different demographic groups. Main characters in television are often depicted as young, outgoing, and energetic. Through the inaccurate portrayal of ethnic groups such as Hispanics, we know that they make up a large portion of the population but are rarely shown as characters. Even Middle-Easterners are widely shown as the villains in television. Therefore, television trains heavy viewers to look at crime such as gun violence, fist fights, and high-speed car chases as normal while actual crime statistics note that violent crime occurs with less than 1% of the US population.

Even across diverse demographics, the amount of viewing can make a difference in terms of viewer conceptions of social reality. For instance, sex-role stereotypes can be traced to the independent contribution of TV viewing, just as sex, age, class, and education contribute. The amount of viewing time is the main element in creating television reality for the audience. According to Gerbner's research, the more time spent absorbing the world of television, the more likely people are to report perceptions of social reality that can be traced to television's most persistent representations of life and society.

Since the 1960s, communication scholars have examined television's contributions to viewers' perceptions of a wide variety of issues. However, little effort has been made to investigate the influence of television on perceptions of social reality among adolescents.

Research supports the concept of television reality arising from heavy viewing. According to Wyer and Budesheim, television messages or information (even when they are not necessarily considered truthful) can still be used by viewers to make social judgments. Furthermore, the information shown to be invalid may still inform an audience's judgments.

The influence of primetime television shows on public perceptions of science and scientists has been explored by Gerbner (Gerbner, 1987). While Gerbner does not place the entire blame on television shows, he highlights the importance of acknowledging the unquestionable role it plays in shaping people's perceptions. Lack of scientific understanding can no longer be associated with 'information-deficit' because we are living in an 'information-rich world'. This also brings up the concerns about the implications of possessing too much scientific knowledge as a viewer. While being well informed helps people to make rational scientific choices, excessive scientific knowledge can bring up apprehensions, fears, suspicion, and mistrust. Prime time shows have a wider reachability, visibility, and interact with people from across diverse backgrounds. Television is used in a relatively nonselective way for viewing. These form the strong basis to conclude that scientists and the scientific community can benefit from stronger connections with the producers, directors, and the entertainment industry at large. The market for science shows has an audience group that faces a mixture of expectations, fears, utilitarian interests, curiosities, ancient prejudices, and superstitions. Gerbner's research used cultivation analysis to understand and examine the response patterns of 1,631 respondents' group which includes light and heavy viewers. They were presented with five propositions - science makes our way of life change too fast; makes our lives healthier, easier, and more comfortable; breaks down people's ideas of right and wrong; is more likely to cause problems than to find solutions; and the growth of science means that a few people can control our lives. The research estimated the percentage of positive responses to science based on two groups divided by sex and education. The study suggested that the exposure to science through television shows cultivate less favorable orientation towards science, especially in high status groups whose light-viewer members are its greatest supporters, and lower status groups have a generally low opinion of science. These observations can be understood through the concept of mainstreaming.

Gender and sexuality

LGBT
Sara Baker Netzley (2010) conducted research similar to Gerbner's into the way that gay people were depicted on television. This study found that there was an extremely high level of sexual activity in comparison to the number of gay characters that appeared on television. This has led those who are heavy television consumers to believe that the gay community is extremely sexual. Much like the idea of a mean and scary world, it gives people an exaggerated sense of a sexualized gay community.

A study conducted by Jerel Calzo and Monique Ward (2009) begins by analysing recent research conducted into the portrayal of gay and lesbian characters on television. While the representation of gay and lesbian characters has continued to grow, the study found that most television shows frame gay and lesbian characters in a manner that reinforces LGBT stereotypes. Diving into the discussion, Calzo and Ward describe even shows such as Ellen and Will & Grace as having storyline content that reinforces "stereotypes by portraying [...] characters as lacking stable relationships, as being preoccupied with their sexuality (or not sexual at all), and by perpetuating the perception of gay and lesbian people as laughable, one-dimensional figures." Their findings confirmed that media genres played an important role in forming attitudes regarding homosexuality. They were surprised by the finding that prior primetime shows, which are no longer on air, reinforced greater acceptance within the LGBTQ realm. They then suggested that, because genre played a large role in the perceptions that viewers formed while watching certain television shows, research should focus on "more genre-driven effects analyses."

Men and Women
In their 2022 study, Scharrer and Warren examined the endorsement of traditionally masculine values in regard to gender norms among combined viewers of streaming services such as Netflix, video games, and YouTube. Traditionally masculine traits in this study included "emotional detachment, dominance, toughness, and/or avoidance of femininity among boys and girls in the sample" (Scharrer & Warren, 2022). Results showed that participants in the heavy viewer category indicated higher scores of endorsement of traditionally masculine traits for men compared to light viewers.

Beverly Roskos-Ewoldsen, John Davies, and David Roskos-Ewoldsen (2004) posit that perceptions of women are integrated in a rather stereotypical fashion, compared to portrayals of men, on television. They state that, "men are characters in TV shows at about a 2 to 1 ratio to women." Viewers who consume more television usually also have more traditional views of women. Research has also shown that women are more likely to be portrayed as victims on television than men.

Alexander Sink and Dana Mastro (2017) studied women and gender depictions on American prime-time television. Although women are often perceived to be better represented on television in recent years, these researchers claim that this is not necessarily the case. They claim women are proportionally underrepresented on prime time television, making up 39% of characters even though women make up 50.9% of the population in the US. Men were also portrayed as more dominant than women, and although men were more often objectified, women were consistently portrayed as hyper-feminized and hyper-sexualized. Fewer older women appeared during prime time, compared to men, and were often shown to be less competent than older male characters.

Sexual attitudes
A study by Bradley J. Bond and Kristin L. Drogos (2014) examined the relationship between exposure to the television program Jersey Shore and sexual attitudes and behaviour in college-aged adults. They found a positive relationship between time spent watching Jersey Shore and increased sexual permissiveness. This effect was found to be stronger in the younger participants than in older ones and held true even when the researchers controlled for other influences on participants' sexual attitudes, such as religious beliefs and parents' attitudes. This higher level of sexually permissive attitudes and behaviour was not a result of higher overall exposure to television, but specifically to greater exposure to Jersey Shore, a highly sexualized program.

Race and ethnicity
Meghan S. Sanders and Srividya Ramasubramanian (2012) studied perceptions that African American media consumers hold about fictional characters portrayed in film and television. They found that—while study participants tended to view all African American characters positively—social class, rather than race or ethnicity, mattered more in perceptions about the warmth and competence of a character. Their study suggests that the ethnicity of media consumers needs to be taken into account in cultivation studies, because media consumers with different backgrounds likely perceive media portrayals, and their faithfulness to reality, differently.

A study by Elizabeth Behm-Morawitz and David Ta (2014) examined the cultivation effects of video games on White students' perceptions of Black and Asian individuals. While no significant effects were found for perceptions of Asian individuals, researchers found that those who spent a greater amount of time playing video games, no matter what genre, held a less positive view of Black people. They also found that real-life interaction with Black individuals did not change this effect. Behm-Morawitz and Ta suggest that the stable, negative racial and ethnic stereotypes portrayed in video game narratives of any genre impact real-world beliefs, in spite of more varied real-life interactions with racial and ethnic minorities.

Chrysalis Wright and Michelle Craske (2015) conducted a study using the cultivation framework to examine the relationship between music lyrics and videos that contained sexual content and the sexual behaviors of African American, Hispanic and Caucasian young adults. In previous studies, it was hypothesized that the heavy listening habits of youth to sexually explicit content can alter the listener's perception of reality and normalize risky sexual behaviors. However, Wright and Caste are the first study to assess the cultivation framework's ability to explain the possible relationship. Their findings concluded that there were minimal effects on those from Caucasian or Hispanic backgrounds with one or two normalized sexual behaviors, such as age of first relationship and sexual encounter. In comparison, researchers found that there were several normalized sexual behaviors found within participants from an African American background, such as earlier age of first date and sexual encounter, higher amount of casual sexual encounters and lower percentage of condom usage.

It is speculated that the effects of cultivation are more prominent within the African American community as opposed to other ethnic groups as African Americans might view music as an accurate representation of their culture. Chen (2006) found that rap music was the most popular music genre listened to by African Americans, and more explicit sexual references have been associated with rap in comparison to other genres with "78% of rap, 53% of pop, 37% of rock, and 36% of country music videos containing some form of sexual reference." Furthermore, previous research displayed that non-Caucasian artists make more allusions to sexual content, referencing sexual acts 21% of the time as compared to 7.5% of the time by Caucasian artists. These cultivation effects of musicians creating a false reality in regards to sexual behaviors and experiences through their lyrics and videos may make African American listeners in particular more vulnerable to "adopt thinking processes and behave similar to the content contained in the music they are exposed to."

Politics and policy preferences
Diana Mutz and Lilach Nir (2010) conducted a study of how fictional television narratives can influence viewers' policy preferences and positive or negative attitudes regarding the justice system in the real world. They found that positive portrayals of the criminal justice system were associated with viewers' more positive view of the system in real life, whereas negative television portrayals were associated with viewers' feeling that the criminal justice system often works unfairly. Furthermore, researchers found that these attitudes did influence viewers' policy preferences concerning the criminal justice system in real life.

A study by Anita Atwell Seate and Dana Mastro (2016) studied news coverage of immigration and its relationship to viewers' immigration policy preferences and negative attitudes regarding immigrants. They found that exposure to negative messages about immigrants in the news generated anxious feelings towards the outgroup (i.e., immigrants), particularly when the news program showed a member of the outgroup. This exposure did not necessarily immediately influence immigration policy preferences, but long-term exposure to messages of this kind can affect such preferences.

Katerina-Eva Matsa (2010) explored cultivation effects through her thesis on television's impact on political engagement in Greece. She did so by describing the role of satirical television within the cultural realm in Greece and how this form of television created ingrained perceptions that Greek political institutions are corrupt, thus negatively influencing the Greek public's overall opinion of politics in their country.

New media
Cultivation theory has been applied to the study of new media. Scholars Morgan, Shanahan & Signorielli noted that media technology has not been static, and may continue to evolve. Therefore, older methods of cultivation analysis may have to move from counting hours of television viewed, and take a big data approach. These authors argue that, although many were skeptical that cultivation theory would be applicable with the increasing importance of new media, these new media still use narrative; and, since those narratives affect us, cultivation theory is still relevant.

Croucher (2011) applied cultivation theory to his theory of social media and its effects on immigrant cultural adaptation. He theorizes that immigrants who use the dominant social media while they are still in the process of adapting to their new culture will develop perceptions about their host society from that media. He believes that this cultivation effect will also impact the way immigrants interact offline with natives of the host country. In a similar vein, the cultivation framework has been applied to the study of body image effects on social media platforms, with research indicating that browsing through certain types of content relates to distorted views on the physical appearances of strangers.

Sports

Cultivation theory attempts to predict that media viewing influences the values and beliefs that people have and the things they believe are "reality". A study conducted by the University of Connecticut's David Atkin revealed insights about television viewing of sports and the values of its viewers. The hypothesis stated that the "Level of agreement with sports-related values (i.e., being physically fit, athletic, and active) is positively related to participation in sports-related media and leisure activities." The results from the study supported the hypothesis, specifically that "those for whom being physically fit, being athletic and being active are important are exposed to more sports media." In this instance, cultivation theory is present because heavier exposure is related to greater agreement with the values that the media present.

An article titled "Sport in Society: Cultures, Commerce, Media and Politics", concluded that "the line of research has found that, as exposure to television increases, an individual's beliefs and opinions of the real-world become more similar to that of the television world." This statement proves to be in support of the previous hypothesis and supports cultivation theory being present in the sporting world, in the sense that the more sport-related media that someone consumes, the more likely they are to value being physically fit.

Another aspect of cultivation theory being studied in relation to sports is the difference between those who participate in sporting events and those who watch them. Cultivation theory can explain people being less active and the rise in obesity levels, because of what they watch on television. Because people don't see many active people on television, their "reality" is that people no longer need to be active 30 or so minutes per day.

Cultivation theory can be applied to America's shift toward so-called "violent sports". A survey undertaken in 1998 showed that only 67% of American teenagers considered themselves to be baseball fans, compared to 78% who responded, identifying themselves as football fans. This study correlates with current TV ratings, as since 2005, football has by far the most hours watched, at 111.9 million hours. Leo W. Jeffres, Jae-Won Lee, and Kimberly A. Neuendorf say that a "new 'media logic' that favors more violent, action-oriented sports" has emerged, "while slower-paced sports have been relegated to secondary status in the United States."

Although there was no true correlation between cultivation theory and sports, there has been research conducted on the level of violence in sports content and the effects it has on viewers. Results by Raney and Depalma (2006) found that individuals were less likely to report being in a positive mood after watching violent sports content.

Altruistic behaviour 
Zakir Shah, Jianxun Chu, Usman Ghani, Sara Qaisar, and Zameer Hassan (2020) conducted the first study from the perspective of cultivation theory to determine the mediating role of fear of victimization, gained from exposure to disaster-related media, on altruistic behaviour. Findings show that exposure to disaster-related news and individuals’ perceptions taken from the media contributed to fear of victimization. Moreover, fear of victimization from disaster significantly influences the altruistic behaviour of people.

Minors are affected by the Internet 
Cultivation theory, which mainly studies the long-term impact of television on the audience, in a specific group of people, the longer it watches TV, the closer the audience's perception of reality is to the content of the TV. Cultivation theory is one of the most common theories in today's lives, especially for teens and children, because adults can control and discern content on TV shows and social media, but minors cannot tell the difference between right and wrong all the time, “for example, the fact that media often broadcast programs, news or movies with violent content creates a social environment in which violence is taught and consumed.” (Busair Ahmad, 2015). Therefore, how to protect them well is also a problem that the whole society needs to explore and solve because modern society is developing faster and faster, and the Internet has caused many regulatory problems in addition to bringing many benefits. That is the hope that television and film programs will be reformed to reduce the impact on children, and the government and people from all walks of life are also working hard to formulate policies and to protect young people. “We provide recommendations for clinicians, policymakers, and educators in partnering with caregivers and youth to support electronic media use that promotes positive outcomes in these areas.” (Gaidhane, 2018). The problem can be paid attention to by institutions or organizations such as society and doctors, as well as more professional people, indicating that this is not a small thing. The problem also plagues governments and parents around the world, who need to work together to solve the impact of the Internet on adolescents and minors to better protect their future and make society more prosperous and stable. The Internet and informatization have brought many beautiful things, but everything has two sides, and human beings can be better served if the information is controlled.

See also

 Annenberg School for Communication at the University of Pennsylvania
 Availability heuristic
 Consensus reality
 Media influence
 Reality TV
 Sociological theory

References

Further reading
 

Communication theory